Highway 4 (AR 4, Ark. 4, and Hwy. 4) is a designation for two state highways in Arkansas. The western segment of  runs from SH-4 at the Oklahoma state line and terminates in Cove. An eastern segment of  begins at U.S. Route 278 (US 278) in McGehee and heads east to Arkansas City then north to Highway 1 before terminating. The eastern segment is part of the Great River Road.

Route description

Oklahoma to Cove
The route enters Arkansas as Oklahoma State Highway 4 and runs east to Cove. The route then meets US 59/US 71 and ends. AR 4 formerly continued along US 59/US 71 south to Wickes, then across the state along present US 278.

McGehee to Rowher

Highway 4 begins east of McGehee at US 65/US 165/US 278. The route winds east past the Delta Country Club and Trippe Holly Grove Cemetery before curving due east toward Arkansas City. The route runs east to Arkansas City. At Arkansas City, the route has its only spur route, which serves the historic part of town, while AR 4 turns north. The highway runs along the Mississippi River briefly before terminating at AR 1.

Major intersections

Arkansas City spur

Former special routes

Camden business loop

The route began on Washington Street near the Camden Country Club and terminated at U.S. 79B.

Camden spur

Highway 4S was a spur route in Camden, following the under-construction bypass. The route was redesignated as Highway 4 in 1976.

Warren business loop

See also

 List of state highways in Arkansas

References

External links

004
Transportation in Polk County, Arkansas
Transportation in Desha County, Arkansas
U.S. Route 278